The Critics' Choice Super Award for Best Science Fiction/Fantasy Series is an award presented to the best television series in the genre of science fiction or fantasy by the Critics Choice Association.

Winners and Nominees

Series with multiple nominations 
 Star Trek: Discovery (CBS All Access/Paramount+) – 2

References 

Broadcast Film Critics Association Awards